Odd Fellows Cemetery was a 32 acre cemetery located North and South of Diamond Street and between 22nd and 25th Street in the North Philadelphia West neighborhood of Philadelphia, Pennsylvania. It was established in 1849 by the Odd Fellows fraternal organization for the burial of their members. The eighty-one foot high, brown stone, Egyptian Revival gatehouse was designed by architects Stephen Decatur Button and Joseph C. Hoxie.

The Odd Fellows Cemetery was located a short distance from Old Glenwood Cemetery and adjoined the smaller United American Mechanics' Cemetery.

The cemetery was a part of the United States National Cemetery System during the American Civil War with a leased lot within the cemetery for 277 soldiers that died in nearby hospitals. The soldiers' remains were reinterred to the Philadelphia National Cemetery in 1885.

In 1951, the cemetery property was acquired by the Philadelphia Housing Authority for construction of the Raymond Rosen housing project. The bodies were moved to two other cemeteries owned by the Odd Fellows – Mount Peace Cemetery in Philadelphia and Lawnview Memorial Park in Rockledge, Pennsylvania.  However, in 2013, workers unearthed 28 graves and remains that were not moved and were still under the playground of the William Dick school built in 1954.

Notable burials
 Manuel Azadigian (1901–1924), painter and sculptor
 Peter Cross (1815–1862), U.S. Mint assistant engraver
 Charles Kochersperger (1826–1867), Union Army officer
 George Lippard (1822–1854), Novelist, journalist, playwright, social activist and labor organizer The Lippard grave and memorial were moved to Lawnview in 1951.
 John Francis Staunton (1821–1875), Union Army Colonel

References

External links
 
 The Odd End to Philadelphia's Odd Fellows Cemetery

1849 establishments in Pennsylvania
American Civil War cemeteries
Cemeteries established in the 1840s
Cemeteries in Philadelphia
Former cemeteries
North Philadelphia
Odd Fellows cemeteries in the United States
United States national cemeteries